Pietro Antonio Auletta (1698–1771) was an Italian composer known mainly for his operas. His opera buffa Orazio gained popularity after being mis-attributed to Pergolesi as Il maestro de musica.

References

1698 births
1771 deaths
Italian Baroque composers
Italian male classical composers
Italian opera composers
Male opera composers
18th-century Italian composers
18th-century Italian male musicians